The 2019–20 season was Galatasaray's 116th season in existence and the club's 62nd consecutive season in the top flight of Turkish football. The season covered the period from 1 July 2019 to 24 July 2020.

Season overview
Galatasaray renewed the squad with new signings including Ryan Babel, Adem Büyük, Jimmy Durmaz and the Nigerian youngster Valentine Ozornwafor. Some key players whose loan contracts had ended at the end of the previous season left the club, including Henry Onyekuru and Badou Ndiaye.
The club began its pre-season with the first training and medical tests in Florya on 4 July 2019. The team stayed in Istanbul until 14 July before beginning their Austria camp in Seefeld in Tirol from 17 to 23 July. The pre-season concluded after training sessions in Florya on 24 July.

Squad information

First team squad

Transfers and loans

Due to breach of the UEFA Financial Fair Play Regulations, Galatasaray and UEFA agreed on a settlement lasting until the end of the 2021–22 season. This meant that the club had a calculated restriction on the number of new transfers it could include within the first team squad for the purposes of participation in UEFA club competitions. This calculation was based on the club's net transfer position in each respective registration period covered by the settlement agreement.

Transfers in

Transfers out

Loans in

Loans out

Transfer summary
Undisclosed fees are not included in the transfer totals.

Expenditure

Summer:  €7,400,000

Winter:  €0,000,000

Total:  €7,400,000

Income

Summer:  €4,500,000

Winter:  €0,000,000

Total:  €4,500,000

Net totals

Summer:  €2,900,000

Winter:  €0,000,000

Total:  €2,900,000

Statistics

Squad appearances and goals
Last updated on 25 May 2019.

|-
! colspan="14" style="background:#dcdcdc; text-align:center"|Goalkeepers
|-
! colspan="14" style="background:#dcdcdc; text-align:center"|Defenders
|-
! colspan="14" style="background:#dcdcdc; text-align:center"|Midfielders
|-
! colspan="14" style="background:#dcdcdc; text-align:center"|Forwards
|-
|}

Squad statistics
{|class="wikitable" style="text-align:center"
|-
!
!style="width:70px"|League
!style="width:70px"|Europe
!style="width:70px"|Cup
!style="width:70px"|Others
!style="width:70px"|Total
|-
|align="left"|Games played       || - || - || - || - || -
|-
|align="left"|Games won          || - || - || - || - || -
|-
|align="left"|Games drawn        || - || - || - || - || -
|-
|align="left"|Games lost         || - || - || - || - || -
|-
|align="left"|Goals scored       || - || - || - || - || -
|-
|align="left"|Goals conceded     || - || - || - || - || -
|-
|align="left"|Goal difference    || - || - || - || - || -
|-
|align="left"|Clean sheets       || - || - || - || - || -
|-
|align="left"|Goal by Substitute || - || - || - || - || -
|-
|align="left"|Total shots        || – || – || – || – || –
|-
|align="left"|Shots on target    || – || – || – || – || –
|-
|align="left"|Corners            || – || – || – || – || –
|-
|align="left"|Players used       || – || – || – || – || –
|-
|align="left"|Offsides           || – || – || – || – || –
|-
|align="left"|Fouls suffered     || – || – || – || – || –
|-
|align="left"|Fouls committed    || – || – || – || – || –
|-
|align="left"|Yellow cards       || - || - || - || - || -
|-
|align="left"|Red cards          || - || - || - || - || -
|-

Goalscorers

As of match played 25 May 2019.

Disciplinary record

Pre-season and friendlies

Competitions

Overview

Süper Lig

Standings

Results summary

Results by round

Matches

Turkish Super Cup

Turkish Cup

Fifth round

Round of 16

Quarter-finals

UEFA Champions League

Group stage

Attendances

 Sold season tickets: 47,729

See also
 2019–20 Süper Lig
 2019–20 Turkish Cup
 2019–20 UEFA Champions League

References

External links
Galatasaray Sports Club Official Website 
Turkish Football Federation - Galatasaray A.Ş. 
uefa.com - Galatasaray AŞ

2019-20
Turkish football clubs 2019–20 season
2019 in Istanbul
2020 in Istanbul
Galatasaray Sports Club 2019–20 season